The 20th annual Nuestra Belleza México pageant, was held at the Presidential Hangar of Aeropuerto Internacional "Lic. Adolfo López Mateos" of Toluca, Estado de México, Mexico on October 19, 2013. Thirty-three contestants of the Mexican Republic competed for the national title, which was won by Josselyn Garciglia from Baja California Sur who later competed in Miss Universe 2014 in United States. Garciglia was crowned by outgoing Nuestra Belleza México titleholder Cynthia Duque. She is the first Sudcaliforniana to win this title.

The Nuestra Belleza Mundo México title was won by Daniela Álvarez from Morelos who later competed in Miss World 2014 in United Kingdom where she was a semifinalist in the Top 10.  Álvarez was crowned by outgoing Nuestra Belleza Mundo México titleholder Marilyn Chagoya. She is the second Morelense to win this title.

Vianey Vázquez from Aguascalientes was designated by the Nuestra Belleza México Organization as Nuestra Belleza Internacional México 2014. She later competed in Miss International 2014 in Japan where she was a Semifinalist in the Top 10. She is the second Hidrocálida to win this Title.

For the second consecutive time and for the sixth time in the history of the pageant, two events were held separately to select the two winners for the titles Nuestra Belleza México and Nuestra Belleza Mundo México.

The recognition "Corona al Mérito 2013" was for Marisol González, Nuestra Belleza México 2002, actress and TV hostess.

Results

Placements

Nuestra Belleza Mundo México
Two days before to the final competition was held the semifinal competition with a live show entitled "Nuestra Belleza Mundo Mexico" in which was announced the winner of the Nuestra Belleza Mundo México title Daniela Álvarez from Morelos who represented the country in Miss World 2014. All contestants competed in swimsuit and evening gown during the contest.

The Nuestra Belleza Mundo México pageant was held at the Presidential Hangar of Aeropuerto Internacional "Lic. Adolfo López Mateos" of Toluca, Estado de México, Mexico on October 17, 2013 and was hosted by Karla Gómez and Jan. It was the 6th edition of the "Nuestra Belleza Mundo México" contest and as an official separate pageant to choose Mexico's representative to Miss World. The Winner of this event does not compete in the final night competition.

National costume competition
In this competition the contestants are not evaluated, only the costumes. It's a competition showing the country's wealth embodied in the colorful and fascinating costumes made by Mexican designers combining the past and present of Mexico.

For the Nuestra Belleza México Organization this event is very important because it discloses the creative work of the great Mexican designers and also select the costume to represent Mexico in Miss Universe the next year. Also, some costumes are elected to represent Mexico in other beauty contests.

The winning costume designer will receive the "Aguja Diamante Award"

 - "Serenata Mexicana"
 - "México Lindo"
 - "Fiesta de Sarao Campechano" (Competed in Miss International 2013)
 - "Serpiente de Luz, Equinocio de Primavera" (Competed in Reina Hispanoamericana 2013)
 - "Galereña"
 - "Comerciante Indígena, Mujer de Lucha"
 - "Talavera Mexicana" (Competed in Best Model of the World 2013)
 - "Bella Flor de Maíz"
 - "Quetzalcóatl" (Competed in Miss Universe 2014)
 - "Sandunga, Sangre Tehuana" (Competed in Miss Earth 2013)
 - "Raíces Malacateras"
 - "Alebrije Oaxaqueño"
 - "Mucume"
 - "Zandunguera"
 - "Paraíso Lindo - "Jarocha"
 - "Achuykaak, Diosa de la Guerra
 - "Diosa Quetzalcóatl"
 - "Victoria, Novia de Filigrana y Oro"

Special awards

Judges
They were the same judges at the Preliminary and Final Competition.
Nicandro Díaz - TV Producer
Juan Osorio - TV Producer
Sergio Mayer - Actor
Diego Di Marco - TV Host and Health Coach
Dr. Ángel Carranza - Plastic Surgeon
Silvia Galván - Image Designer
Anagabriela Espinoza - Miss International 2009 and TV Hostess
Carolina Morán - Nuestra Belleza Mundo México 2006 and TV Hostess
Dafne Molina -  Nuestra Belleza Mundo México 2004 and TV Hostess

Contestants

Notes

Designates
 - Rocío Hernández
 - Clarisa Sandoval
 - Estefanía Cobos

Returning states
 Campeche

Withdrawals
 Alejandra Sandoval withdrew from the competition due to Appendix surgery days before the national concentration. Her Suplente/1 st Runner-up Estefany Camargo declined to participate in the national final for reasons unknown. So the State of Zacatecas had no representative in this edition.

References

External links
Official Website

.Mexico
2013 in Mexico
2013 beauty pageants